Mahayana Temple is a Chinese Buddhist temple located within a forest in South Cairo, New York. It is the retreat of the  Eastern States Buddhist Temple of America, Inc.  ("ESBT"), whose downtown branch of the Mahayana Temple (aka Mahayana City Campus) is located in New York. The original retreat land was donated by James Ying. 
The temple grounds in South Cairo contain the Grand Buddha Hall (with dormitories located in the wings and a dining hall located on the lower level), the Kuan Yin Hall, the 500 Arhat Hall, the Seven Storied Jade Pagoda, the Earth Spirit Bodhisattva Hall, a three-unit temple dedicated to the spirits of the land, and an obelisk marking the burial site of members of the Ying family.

External links
Mahayana Temple

Buddhist temples in New York (state)
Buddhist monasteries in the United States
Chinese-American culture in New York (state)
Pure Land temples
Buildings and structures in Putnam County, New York
Tourist attractions in Putnam County, New York